Francesca Chircop (born 20 October 1993) is a Maltese footballer who plays as a forward for Mġarr United FC. She has been a member of the Malta women's national team.

See also
List of Malta women's international footballers

References

1993 births
Living people
Women's association football forwards
Maltese women's footballers
Malta women's international footballers
Hibernians F.C. players